Henry Williams (November 30, 1805 – May 8, 1887) was a U.S. Representative from Massachusetts.  Born in Taunton, Williams attended Brown University, and studied law. He was admitted to the bar in 1829 and commenced practice in Taunton.

He served as member of the Massachusetts House of Representatives, and served in the Massachusetts State Senate.

Williams was elected as a Democrat to the Twenty-sixth Congress (March 4, 1839 – March 3, 1841).  He was an unsuccessful candidate for reelection in 1840 to the Twenty-seventh Congress.  He was elected to the Twenty-eighth Congress (March 4, 1843 – March 3, 1845). After retiring from elected office, he resumed the practice of law and died in Taunton on May 8, 1887.  He was interred in Mount Pleasant Cemetery.

References

1805 births
1887 deaths
Democratic Party members of the Massachusetts House of Representatives
Democratic Party Massachusetts state senators
Politicians from Taunton, Massachusetts
Democratic Party members of the United States House of Representatives from Massachusetts
19th-century American politicians
Brown University alumni